Faraya is a village and municipality in the Keserwan District of the  Keserwan-Jbeil Governorate, Lebanon. It is located 46 kilometers north of Beirut. Elevation start from 1290 meters to 2000 meters above sea level and its total land area is 870 hectares. Faraya's inhabitants are predominantly Maronite Christians.

History
According to the 17th-century historian and Maronite patriarch Istifan al-Duwayhi, Faitroun was settled by Shia Muslims from Baalbek in the 16th century. Ottoman tax records, which did not differentiate between Muslim communities, indicate the village had 45 Muslim and 17 Christian households and one imam in 1523, 29 Muslim and 9 Christian households in 1530, and 43 Muslim and 16 Christian households in 1543.

During the civil war Faraya was a Lebanese Forces (LF) stronghold. In 1989 it was reported that the LF had a secret base in Wadi Chabrouh, north of Faraya, where they held a number of Frog missiles.

In 2017, Lebanon's largest statue of Saint Charbel was inaugurated making it one of the most visited pilgrimage sites in Lebanon.

Geography
The name "Faraya" stands for "The land of fruits and vegetables" in Phoenician due to its soil fertility. Faraya is located in the Keserwan District in Lebanon, 42 km away from Beirut, and 20 km away from Jounieh, Faraya has an altitude ranging from 1200 m to 2000 m. The road to Faraya from the coastal highway passes through Ajaltoun, Ashqout, Faytroun, Mairouba, and Hrajel and 5 min to mzaar ski resort

In 2007, the Chabrouh Dam was inaugurated creating one of the highest reservoirs in the Middle-east region, but as a result, flooded more than three quarter of the orchards.

Climate

References

Bibliography

Populated places in Keserwan District
Maronite Christian communities in Lebanon